James G. Price (born October 2, 1966) is a former American football tight end in the National Football League for the Los Angeles Rams, Dallas Cowboys and the St. Louis Rams. He played college football at Stanford University.

Early years
Price grew up in Montville, New Jersey and played high school football at Montville Township High School, where he was a teammate of future NFL defensive end Lester Archambeau. 

He also practiced baseball and basketball.

College career
Price accepted a football scholarship from Stanford University. As a freshman, he was a reserve player behind Eric Snelson, making 6 receptions for 50 yards.

As a sophomore, he was named the starter at tight end, collecting 15 receptions for 235 yards and 4 receiving touchdowns (tied for 8th in the PAC-10). As a junior, he had 13 receptions for 126 yards and 3 receiving touchdowns.

His best year came as a senior, recording 45 receptions (second on the team and tied for 8th in the PAC-10) for 391 yards (third on the team) and no receiving touchdowns. He played his best game that season against Notre Dame, tying a school record with 14 catches. He finished his college career with 79 receptions for 802 yards and 8 touchdowns.

He also practiced baseball, where he was a starting pitcher for two seasons, which included the 1987 National Championship team.

Professional career

Los Angeles Rams
Price was signed as an undrafted free agent by the Los Angeles Rams after the 1990 NFL Draft. On October 3, he was signed to the practice squad. 

In 1991, he started 6 games, while posting 34 receptions (third on the team) for 410 yards and 2 touchdowns. On November 25, he suffered a fractured right fibula against the San Francisco 49ers in the twelfth game of the season. On November 26, he was placed on the injured reserve list.

In 1992, he tallied 35 receptions (fourth on the team) for 324 yards and 2 touchdowns.

In 1993, he had a contract holdout for 51 days, and although he was signed on September 6, he didn't play that year for the Rams, sitting out 3 games and being declared inactive for one contest. On October 5, he was traded to the Dallas Cowboys in exchange for a sixth-round draft choice (#189-Ronald Edwards).

Dallas Cowboys
In 1993, the Dallas Cowboys acquired Price after losing three backup tight ends to season-ending injuries, reuniting him with offensive coordinator Norv Turner, who was the Rams' wide receivers and tight ends coach in 1990. He was used mostly as a blocking tight end and appeared in 3 games, registering one reception for four yards. On October 31, he suffered a torn peroneal tendon injury against the Philadelphia Eagles. On November 10, he was placed on the injured reserve list and was replaced with Scott Galbraith. The team would go on to win Super Bowl XXVIII. He was declared a free agent after the season and wasn't re-signed.

St. Louis Rams
On June 2, 1995, he was signed as a free agent by the St. Louis Rams, after being out of football for a year. He appeared in 13 games, making 6 receptions for 4 yards. He wasn't re-signed after the season.

Personal life
Price became a talent agent in Los Angeles, representing actors, directors and writers. His brother Bob Price played tight end in the Canadian Football League.

References

External links
MTHS Hall of Fame Class of 2001

1966 births
Living people
Montville Township High School alumni
People from Englewood, New Jersey
People from Montville, New Jersey
American football tight ends
Stanford Cardinal baseball players
Stanford Cardinal football players
Los Angeles Rams players
Dallas Cowboys players
St. Louis Cardinals (football) players
American talent agents
players of American football from New Jersey
Sportspeople from Morris County, New Jersey